Frank L. Meline (August 5, 1875 - August 17, 1944) was an American real estate developer and architect. He developed a subdivision of Bel Air in the 1920s, and he designed the Fifth Church of Christ, Scientist and Garden Court Apartments in Los Angeles, California. According to The Los Angeles Times, "Scarcely an undeveloped area in rapidly expanding Los Angeles failed to feel his touch, from city lots to vast acreages in suburban districts."

References

1875 births
1944 deaths
People from Jacksonville, Illinois
People from Brentwood, Los Angeles
American construction businesspeople
Architects from California
Architects from Illinois
20th-century American architects